Akram Seifeddine Kanzari al-Ayyad (born 23 November 1991) is a Libyan football midfielder who currently plays in the Tunisian Championship for CS Hammam-Lif.

References

External links

1991 births
Living people
Libyan footballers
Association football midfielders
CS Hammam-Lif players